Manuel, Duke of Beja may refer to:
 Manuel I of Portugal or Manuel I of Beja, Duke of Beja
 Manuel II of Portugal or Manuel II of Beja, Duke of Beja